Przybylak is a Polish-language surname. Notable people with this surname include:

Daria Przybylak, (born 1991) Polish volleyball player
, Polish geographer and climatologist

See also
, child actress playing Alisa Selezneva in film Island of Rusty General 

Polish-language surnames